Parizeau is a surname of French origin.

Notable people with this surname include:

 Alice Parizeau, Polish-Canadian writer
 André Parizeau, Canadian politician from the Communist Party of Quebec
 Francine Boulay-Parizeau, Canadian handball player
 Jacques Parizeau, Canadian politician
 Michel Parizeau, Canadian ice hockey player
 Damase Parizeau, Canadian politician
 Roger Parizeau, Canadian politician

See also
 Pariseau (disambiguation)